Sherman Way is a planned light rail station in the Los Angeles County Metro Rail system. The station is part of the East San Fernando Light Rail Project and planned to open in 2028. It is located on Van Nuys Boulevard at the intersection with Sherman Way in the Van Nuys neighborhood of Los Angeles.

History
The Pacific Electric San Fernando line reached Van Nuys in 1911. By 1913 North Sherman Way was the junction of the Owensmouth and San Fernando branches and featured a 12-car yard. Services were truncated here in 1938; the stop then served as the line's northern terminus until the route was replaced by bus service in 1952.

Sherman Way is named for entrepreneur and Valley developer Gen. Moses Hazeltine Sherman.

References

Future Los Angeles Metro Rail stations
Railway stations scheduled to open in 2028
Van Nuys, Los Angeles
Pacific Electric stations
Railway stations in the United States opened in 1911
Railway stations closed in 1952